A by-election was held for the New South Wales Legislative Assembly electorate of Liverpool on 24 May 1952 because of the resignation of Jim McGirr who had accepted an appointment as chair of the Maritime Services Board.

Dates

Result

Jim McGirr resigned.

See also
Electoral results for the district of Liverpool
List of New South Wales state by-elections

References

1952 elections in Australia
New South Wales state by-elections
1950s in New South Wales